MGB may refer to:
 Game Boy Pocket (product code MGB-001) and Game Boy Light (product code MGB-101), portable gaming devices by Nintendo
 Mathematical Gymnasium Belgrade (Matematička Gimnazija), an elementary and high school for gifted students in Serbia
 Magandang Gabi, Bayan, a news program in the Philippines
 Matterhorn Gotthard Bahn, a railroad operating in the Swiss Alps
 Matthew Good Band, a Canadian group
 Medial geniculate nucleus, or medial geniculate body, a subnucleus of the thalamus in the brain
 Medium Girder Bridge, a modular, military bridge
 MG MGB, a sports car produced by the British Motor Corporation and its successors from 1962 to 1980
 Mines and Geosciences Bureau, a government agency in the Philippines
 Ministry for State Security (Soviet Union) (Ministerstvo Gosudarstvennoi Bezopasnosti), a predecessor of the KGB
 Motor Gun Boat, a fast attack boat armed with cannons and guns, as opposed to the Motor Torpedo Boat
 Mount Gambier Airport, an airport servicing the Mount Gambier region which uses the IATA code MGB